Further Adventures of Jimmy and Wes is an album by American jazz guitarist Wes Montgomery and organist Jimmy Smith. It was recorded in 1966 with Jimmy & Wes: The Dynamic Duo but was not released until 1968.

Reception 

Richard S. Ginell reviewed the reissue for AllMusic, writing that the album:

Track listing
 "King of the Road"  (Roger Miller) – 4:13 
 "Maybe September"  (Percy Faith, Ray Evans, Jay Livingston) – 6:24 
 "O.G.D. (aka Road Song)"  (Wes Montgomery) – 6:08 
 "Call Me"  (Tony Hatch) – 3:13 
 "Milestones"  (Miles Davis) – 4:12 
 "Mellow Mood"  (Jimmy Smith) – 8:44 
 "'Round Midnight" - (bonus track)  (Cootie Williams, Thelonious Monk, Bernie Hanighen) – 7:18

Personnel

Musicians
 Jimmy Smith – Hammond organ
 Wes Montgomery – guitar
 Grady Tate – drums
 Ray Barretto – percussion

Additional musicians on "Milestones" and "'Round Midnight"
 Bob Ashton, Danny Bank, Jerry Dodgion, Jerome Richardson, Phil Woods – woodwinds
 Clark Terry, Ernie Royal, Jimmy Maxwell, Joe Newman – trumpet
 Jimmy Cleveland, Melba Liston, Quentin Jackson – trombone
 Tony Studd – bass trombone
 Richard Davis – bass
 Oliver Nelson – arranger, conductor

Production 
 Creed Taylor – producer
 Val Valentin – director of engineering
 Rudy Van Gelder – engineer
 Dick Smith – art direction
 Chuck Stewart – photography
 Michael Zwerin – liner notes
 Gene Santoro – reissue liner notes

References

1966 albums
Wes Montgomery albums
Jimmy Smith (musician) albums
Albums produced by Creed Taylor
Albums arranged by Oliver Nelson
Albums conducted by Oliver Nelson
Albums recorded at Van Gelder Studio
Collaborative albums
Instrumental duet albums
Verve Records albums